Don Heffington (December 20, 1950March 24, 2021) was an American drummer, percussionist, and songwriter. He was a founding member of the Los Angeles alternative country band Lone Justice, which he performed with from 1982 to 1985. Heffington was also a member of the bluegrass band Watkins Family Hour, recorded three solo albums, and was a session and touring musician for various artists, including Lowell George, Bob Dylan, Emmylou Harris, Jackson Browne, Victoria Williams, the Wallflowers, the Jayhawks, and Joanna Newsom.

Early life
Heffington was born in Los Angeles on December 20, 1950.  He grew up in a musical family – his grandmother played drums and his mother played upright bass, and they passed on their enthusiasm for jazz to Heffington.  Later, Bob Dylan's album Bringing It All Back Home broadened his musical scope to include rock and roll music. As a teen, Heffington joined a jazz band, The Doug Morris Quintet, on drums.

Heffington was drummer for Emmylou Harris's Hot Band.  In that capacity, he played on Blue Kentucky Girl (1979), as well as the 1983 album White Shoes.

Career

Lone Justice
Heffington was a member of the first incarnation of Lone Justice, along with Maria McKee (vocals), Ryan Hedgecock (guitar), and Marvin Etzioni (bass). Heffington was with the band from 1982 until 1985.  In spite of being the group's second drummer, he joined early enough in its existence that McKee spoke of him as an "original member", adding how Heffington was the only one she "never had any drama with".

The presence of Heffington in the band was described by Spin in 1985 as a "kind of professionalizing force".  His sensitivity and musicality drew comparisons with Ringo Starr.  Etzioni stated how Heffington, like Ringo, "didn’t play drums, he played songs".  Hedgecock echoed the sentiment by dubbing Heffington the "King of Swing", recounting how he had "played with a few drummers before, but Don was the first musician that played drums I had encountered".

Watkins Family Hour
Heffington was a member of the Watkins Family Hour, led by Sara Watkins and Sean Watkins. Other members include Sebastian Steinberg (bass), Greg Leisz (pedal steel), Benmont Tench (piano), and David Garza (guitar).

Performing and recording
Heffington has played and/or recorded with many artists, including Dave Alvin, Peter Case, Vic Chesnutt, Delia Bell, Sheryl Crow, Bob Dylan, Kathleen Edwards, Lowell George, the Jayhawks, Rickie Lee Jones, Sam Phillips, Ron Sexsmith, Percy Sledge, Big Mama Thornton, Big Joe Turner, the Wallflowers, Lucinda Williams, and Dwight Yoakam.

Solo and collaborative albums
Heffington briefly reunited with McKee for her solo album You Gotta Sin to Get Saved (1993).  Two years later, he and fiddler Tammy Rogers collaborated on the mostly instrumental In the Red.  This marked the first of three studio albums in his career.  He released his first solo album nearly two decades later titled Gloryland (2014).  He said that he "wanted it to sound like some drunk falling down the stairs while he was practicing the trombone".  Heffington played most of the instruments in that album and recorded with engineer David Vaught.

Contemporary Abstractions in Folk Song and Dance, released in 2015, was recorded live with Heffington (vocals, acoustic guitar), Tim Young (electric guitar) and Sebastian Steinberg (upright bass). Heffington performed as part of the Don Heffington Group with Tim Young, and Sebastian Steinberg.

Later life
Heffington died on March 24, 2021, at his home in Los Feliz, Los Angeles.  He was 70, and had been hospitalized for leukemia prior to his death.

Discography

As leader 
 In the Red with Tammy Rogers (Dead Reckoning, 1995)
 Gloryland (self-released, 2014)
 Contemporary Abstractions in Folk Song and Dance (self-released, 2016)

As Producer 
 2005 The Creekdippers, Mystic Theatre (Glitterhouse)
 2006 Ramsay Midwood, Popular Delusions & The Madness of Cows (Farmwire)
 2009 Amy Allison, Sheffield Streets (Urban Myth)
 2014 Chuck E. Weiss, Red Beans and Weiss (ANTI-)

As sideman 

With Amy Allison
 Sad Girl (Diesel Only, 2001)
 Sheffield Streets (Urban Myth, 2008)

With Dave Alvin
 Ashgrove (Yep Roc, 2004)
 West of the West (Yep Roc, 2006)
 Eleven Eleven (Yep Roc, 2011)
 Lost Time with Phil Alvin (Yep Roc, 2015)

With Neal Casal
 Fade Away Diamond Time (Zoo, 1995)
 Basement Dreams (Fargo, 1998)

With Peter Case
 Sings Like Hell (Vanguard, 1995)
 Torn Again (Vanguard, 1995)
 Full Service No Waiting (Vanguard, 1998)
 Flying Saucer Blues (Vanguard, 2000)
 Who's Gonna Go Your Crooked Mile? (Vanguard, 2004)
 HWY 62 (Omnivore, 2015)
 On the Way Downtown: Recorded Live on FolkScene (Omnivore, 2017)

With Vic Chesnutt
 Silver Lake (New West, 2003)
 Ghetto Bells (New West, 2005)

With Bob Dylan
 Empire Burlesque (Columbia, 1985)
 Knocked Out Loaded (Columbia, 1986)

With Marvin Etzioni
 The Mandolin Man (Restless, 1992)
 Weapons Of The Spirit (Restless, 1994)

With Tony Gilkyson
 Sparko (Askew, 1997)
 Goodbye Guitar (Rolling Sea, 2006)With Jimmie Dale Gilmore Braver Newer World (Elektra, 1996)
 One Endless Night (Rounder, 2000)With Barry Goldberg In The Groove (Sunset Blvd, 2017)
 Stoned Again (Antone's, 2002)With Lone Justice Lone Justice (Geffen, 1985)
 This Is Lone Justice: The Vaught Tapes 1983 (Omnivore, 2014)With Christy McWilson The Lucky One (Hightone, 2000)
 Bed of Roses (Hightone, 2002)With Buddy Miller Your Love and Other Lies (Hightone, 1995)
 Cruel Moon (HighTone, 1999)With Fernando Ortega Night of Your Return (RPI, 1996)
 Home (RPI, 2000)With Sam Phillips Martinis & Bikinis (Omnivore, 1994)
 Omnipop (It's Only a Flesh Wound Lambchop) (Virgin, 1996)With Amy Rigby Diary of A Mod Housewife (Koch, 1996)
 Middlescence (Koch, 1998)With Adam Sandler What's Your Name? (Warner Bros., 1997)
 Stan and Judy's Kid (Warner Bros., 1999)
 Shhh...Don't Tell (Warner Bros., 2004)With Ron Sexsmith Forever Endeavour (Cooking Vinyl, 2013)
 Carousel One (Compass, 2015)With Rick Shea Sawbones (Aim 2000)
 Bound for Trouble (Tres Pescadores, 2005)With Victoria Williams Loose (Atlantic, 1994)
 Water to Drink (Atlantic, 2000)
 Sings Some Ol' Songs (Atlantic, 2002)
 Town Hall 1995 (Fire America, 2017)With others' 1980 Seals and Crofts, The Longest Road (Rhino)
 1983 Delia Bell, Delia Bell (Warner Bros.) – reissued in 2006 on Wounded Bird
 1983 Emmylou Harris, White Shoes (Warner Bros.)
 1983 Leo Kottke, Time Step (Chrysalis)
 1991 Carla Olson and Mick Taylor, Too Hot For Snakes (Razor Edge)
 1993 Maria McKee, You Gotta Sin to Get Saved (Geffen)
 1993 Chuck Prophet, Balinese Dancer (China / Homestead)

 1995 The Jayhawks, Tomorrow the Green Grass (American)
 1995 Kieran Kane, Dead Rekoning (Dead Reckoning)

 1995 David Olney, High, Wide and Lonesome (Philo)
 1995 Tom Russell, The Rose of the San Joaquin (Hightone)
 1995 various artists, A Testimonial Dinner: The Songs of XTC (Thirsty Ear)
 1996 Rosie Flores, Honky Tonk Reprise (Rounder)
 1996 Bob Neuwirth, Look Up (Watermelon)
 1996 Kim Stockwood, Bonavista (EMI Canada)
 1996 Daniel Tashian, Sweetie (Elektra)
 1996 The Wallflowers, Bringing Down the Horse (Interscope)

 1997 Jonny Kaplan, California Heart (Muna Tea)
 1997 David Poe, David Poe (550 Music)

 1998 Sinead Lohan, No Mermaid (Interscope)
 1998 Chuck Pyle, Keepin' Time by the River (Bee 'N Flower)
 1998 Chris Stills, 100 Year Thing (Atlantic)
 1998 various artists, Pearls in the Snow: The Songs of Kinky Friedman (Kinkajou)
 1999 Blue Mountain, Tales of a Traveler (Roadrunner)
 1999 The Derailers, Full Western Dress (Sire)
 1999 Matthew Sweet, In Reverse (Volcano)

 2000 Nick Binkley, Let the Boy Jam (PSB)
 2000 The Drowners, Is There Something On Your Mind? (Wind-Up)
 2000 Larry John McNally, Loose Ends (Leni Stern)
 2000 Ramsay Midwood, Shoot Out at the OK Chinese Restaurant (Vanguard)
 2000 Geoff Muldaur, Password (Hightone)
 2000 Randy Weeks, Madeline (Hightone)

 2001 Annie Rapid, Flood (Orchard)
 2001 Danni Leigh, Divide and Conquer (Audium Entertainment)
 2001 Over The Rhine, Films For Radio (Narada)
 2001 Chuck E. Weiss, Old Souls & Wolf Tickets (Slow River)
 2001 Eddie Zip, New Orleans Live in Hollywood (DJM)
 2002 Pieta Brown, Pieta Brown (Rubric)
 2002 Mike Stinson, Jack of All Heartache (Boronda)
 2002 Mark Olson, December's Child (Dualtone)
 2002 Peter Stuart, Propeller (Vanguard)

 2003 Eleni Mandell, Country for True Lovers (Zedtone)
 2003 Dwight Yoakam, Population Me (New West)
 2004 Moot Davis, Moot Davis (Little Dog)
 2004 Amy Farris, Anyway (Yep Roc)
 2004 Peter Himmelman, Unstoppable Forces (Majestic)
 2004 Tift Merritt, Tambourine (Lost Highway)
 2004 Lila Nelson, Still Got the Farm (self-released)
 2004 Graham Parker, Your Country (Bloodshot)
 2004 Percy Sledge, Shining Through the Rain (Varèse Sarabande)

 2005 Red Grammer, Be Bop Your Best (Red Note)
 2005 Gratitude, Gratitude (Atlantic)
 2005 Grey DeLisle, Iron Flowers (Sugar Hill)
 2005 Judy Henske, She Sang California (Fair Star Music)

 2006 Chris and Thomas, Land of Sea (Defend Music)
 2006 Tim Easton, Ammunition (New West)
 2006 Albert Lee, Road Runner (Sugar Hill)
 2006 Kip Boardman, Hello I Must Be (Mesmer)
 2006 Marley's Ghost, Spooked (Sage Arts)
 2006 Joanna Newsom, Ys (Drag City)
 2007 Dead Rock West, Honey and Salt (Populuxe)
 2007 King Wilkie, Low Country Suite (Rounder)
 2007 Patrick Park, Everyone's in Everyone (Curb Appeal)
 2007 Jack Tempchin, Songs (Audio & Video Labs, Inc.)
 2007 Joe Cocker, Hymn for My Soul (EMI)
 2008 Ted Russell Kamp, Poor Man's Paradise (Dualtone)
 2008 Greg Copeland, Diana and James (Inside Recordings)
 2008 Kathleen Edwards, Asking for Flowers (Zoë)
 2008 Inara George, An Invitation (Everloving)
 2010 Roy Jay, Fairfax Avenue (Rock Ridge)
 2010 Stan Ridgway, Neon Mirage (A440)
 2011 Orchestra Superstring, Easy (Dionysus)
 2012 Mark M. Dawson, The Writing Wall (Dawsophone)
 2012 Don Michael Sampson, Coyote (Red Horse)
 2013 The Living Sisters, Run for Cover (Vanguard)
 2013 Carrie Rodriguez, Give Me All You Got (Ninth Street Opus)
 2014 Wayne Haught, Fingers (Resist Not)
 2015 Jackson Browne, Standing in the Breach (Inside Recordings)
 2015 Miranda Mulholland, Whipping Boy (Fontana North)
 2016 Jim Kweskin and Geoff Muldaur, Penny's Farm (Omnivore Recordings)
 2017 Jerry Yester, Pass Your Light Around (Omnivore Recordings)
 2017 Shelby Lynne and Allison Moorer, Not Dark Yet (Thirty Tigers)
 2019 Big Kettle Drum, I Thought You'd Be Bigger (Kettlehead)
 2019 Various Artists, If You're Going to the City: A Tribute to Mose Allison for Sweet Relief (Fat Possum)
 2019 Josie Cotton, Everything Is Oh Yeah (Kitten Robot)

References

External links 
 
 
 
 

1950 births
2021 deaths
20th-century American drummers
20th-century American male musicians
21st-century American drummers
21st-century American male musicians
American male drummers
American rock drummers
American session musicians
Deaths from cancer in California
Deaths from leukemia
Musicians from Los Angeles
People from Los Feliz, Los Angeles